Princess Maria Amalia of Bourbon-Two Sicilies (Italian: Maria Amalia di Borbone, Principessa di Borbone delle Due Sicilie; 25 February 1818 in Pozzuoli, Two Sicilies – 6 November 1857 in Madrid, Spain) was a Princess of Bourbon-Two Sicilies by birth and an Infanta of Portugal and Spain through her marriage to Infante Sebastian of Portugal and Spain.

Family
Maria Amalia was the tenth child of Francis I of the Two Sicilies and his wife Maria Isabella of Spain.

Marriage
Maria Amalia married Infante Sebastian of Portugal and Spain, only son of Infante Pedro Carlos of Spain and Portugal and his wife Teresa, Princess of Beira, on 25 May 1832 in Madrid, Spain. The marriage remained childless.

Ancestry

References

1818 births
1857 deaths
People from Pozzuoli
Princesses of Bourbon-Two Sicilies
Spanish infantas
Portuguese infantas
House of Bourbon-Braganza
Burials at the Basilica of Santa Chiara
Italian Roman Catholics
Daughters of kings